Jeffrey Camangyan (born September 22, 1976), known professionally as Wowowie de Guzman, is a Filipino dancer and a stage, film and TV actor. He was one of the top matinee idols from the 1990s. His break came as a member of dance group Universal Motion Dancers (UMD). He was nominated as Best Actor for FAMAS Award 1998 in Paano Ang Puso Ko?.

Career
De Guzman was a famous member of dance group Universal Motion Dancers along with Brian Furlow, Jim Salas, James Salas, the late Gerard Faisan, Marco McKinley, Norman Santos, Gerry Oliva and Miggy Tanchanco.

He was the first love team of Judy Ann Santos. The Juday-Wowie love team became the number one screen tandem in the mid to late '90s. They paired in movies which were box office hits such as Sana Naman, Kung Alam Mo Lang, Wow Multo, Mara Clara: The Movie, Esperanza: The Movie, Paano Ang Puso Ko?, Muling Ibalik ang Tamis ng Pag-ibig, Kasal-Kasalan, Sakal-Sakalan, Dito Sa Puso Ko and many others. They also paired in TV series like Mara Clara and Esperanza.

He became a stage actor of Gantimpala Theater Foundation. He played in Florante at Laura, Ibong Adarna, El Filibusterismo, Noli Me Tangere, The Bomb, Alikabok, Loren Ruiz, Romeo Loves Juliet, and Perlita Ng Silangan. He performed in Tanghalang CCP, Ballet Philippines, and Peta, among others.

In 2008, de Guzman appeared in ABS-CBN's fantasy series Kung Fu Kids.

Personal life
De Guzman was Judy Ann Santos' first ever boyfriend; they have since made 12 films together.

He married his non-showbiz wife Sheryl Ann Reyes from Pampanga in 2012. Reyes died on April 26, 2014 at the age of 27, one month after giving birth to their first child. It was reported that the probable cause of death was triggered by medicine which she took after suffering from muscle pain.

Filmography

Television

Film
Dormitoryo: Mga Walang Katapusang Kwarto (2017)
Lilay: Darling of the Crowd (2010)
Malikmata (2003)
Luv Text (2001)
Carta Alas... Huwag Ka Ng Humirit (2001)
Tabi Tabi Po! (2001)
Esperanza: The Movie (1999)
Weder-Weder Lang 'Yan (1999)
Dito Sa Puso Ko (1999)
My Pledge of Love (1999)
Kasal-Kasalan (Sakalan) (1998)
Muling Ibalik ang Tamis ng Pag-ibig (1998)
Paano Ang Puso Ko? (1997)
Wow... Multo! (1997)
Isinakdal Ko ang Aking Ina (1997)
Langit Sa Piling Mo (1997)
Ipaglaban Mo 2: The Movie (1997)
Nasaan Ka Ng Kailangan Kita (1996)
Mara Clara: The Movie (1996)
Kung Alam Mo Lang (1996)
Sana Naman (1996)
Ibigay Mo Ng Todong-todo (1995)
Sige, Ihataw Mo! (Dancin' with the Motion): The Movie (1994)
Anak Ng Pasig (1993)

Discography
"Wala ng Mahihiling Pa" - 1998 movie soundtrack in Kasal-Kasalan (Sakalan)

References

External links

1976 births
Living people
Star Magic
ABS-CBN personalities
GMA Network personalities
Filipino male stage actors
Filipino male dancers
People from Olongapo
Male actors from Zambales
Filipino male television actors
20th-century Filipino male actors
21st-century Filipino male actors
Filipino male film actors